The Technoavia SM-94 series was developed in the early 1990s as a six-seat version of the Yakovlev Yak-18T, incorporating upgraded, modern avionics and aerodynamic refinements.

Design and development
The main changes in the Technoavia SM-94 series, besides the increase in fuselage capacity, were including all-metal wings and empennage with all surfaces re-profiled to give a squarer appearance, a three-blade propeller, increased tankage and two-piece windscreen replacing the original multipane design.

Operational history

In 1997, the SM94-1 development aircraft (RA-44486) was shown at MAKS, Moscow, but series production was subsequently halted by financial concerns.

The Technoavia SM-94 was further developed into the SM-2000 series. The prototype SM-2000P made first flight 21 March 2002 and was displayed at MAKS '03.

Designation SM-2000P differentiates it from the further developed SM-2000 turboprop, that became a separate variant. Since 2006, no further developments have been announced.

Specifications (SM-94)

References

Notes

Bibliography

 Smolensk (Technoavia) SM-2000P (Russian Federation)

Yakovlev aircraft
1990s Soviet and Russian civil utility aircraft
Low-wing aircraft
Single-engined tractor aircraft